Brazil represented by Military Sports Commission of Brazil (Portuguese: Comissão Desportiva Militar do Brasil - CDMB) part of Military Sports Department (Portuguese: Departamento de Desporto Militar - DDM) of Ministry of Defence (Portuguese: Ministério da Defesa) is member of Conseil International du Sport Militaire (CISM). In 2011, the CMDB organized the 5th CISM Military World Games in Rio de Janeiro.

Brazil has participated in all the Summer Military World Games since the beginning in 1995. Brazil is 4th on the all time medal table.

Medal table

By championships
*Red border color indicates tournament was held on home soil.

See also
 Brazil at the Olympics
 Brazil at the Universiade
 Brazil at the Pan American Games

References

External links
International military sports council

Military World Games
Nations at the Military World Games